The 2018–19 Biathlon World Cup – Individual Men started on Thursday 6 December 2018 in Pokljuka and finished on Wednesday 13 March 2019 in Östersund. The defending titlist was Johannes Thingnes Bø of Norway.

The small crystal globe winner for the category was Johannes Thingnes Bø of Norway.

Competition format
The  individual race is the oldest biathlon event; the distance is skied over five laps. The biathlete shoots four times at any shooting lane, in the order of prone, standing, prone, standing, totalling 20 targets. For each missed target a fixed penalty time, usually one minute, is added to the skiing time of the biathlete. Competitors' starts are staggered, normally by 30 seconds.

2017–18 Top 3 standings

Medal winners

Standings

References

Individual Men